Slovakia does not recognise same-sex marriage or civil unions. In addition, the Constitution limits marriage to opposite-sex couples. Bills to recognise same-sex partnerships were introduced several times, in 1997, in 2000, in 2012, in 2018, in 2021 and in 2022 but were all rejected.

There is some legal recognition for unregistered cohabiting same-sex couples, however. Limited rights for a "close person" are recognised under civil and penal law.

Furthermore, per a June 2018 European Court of Justice ruling, same-sex couples have had their freedom of movement and residency rights recognised. This applies only if at least one partner is an EU citizen and if their marriage was performed in an EU member state. Slovak authorities quickly announced compliance with the ruling.

Unregistered cohabitation

Since 2018, Slovak civil and penal law has recognised a "close person", defined as a sibling or a spouse; a family member or a person in a relationship shall be considered under law a "close person" "if an injury suffered by one of them is reasonably felt by the other person as an injury suffered by him or her." Only limited rights are granted, namely in the area of inheritance.

In August 2022, the Freedom and Solidarity (SaS) party introduced a cohabitation agreement bill, which would grant rights including co-ownership, inheritance, access to health documentation, the right to a widow's and widower's pension, and the right to nursing allowance.

Registered partnership
In 2008 and 2009, the LGBT rights group Iniciatíva Inakosť (Otherness Initiative) launched a public awareness campaign for the recognition of registered life partnerships between same-sex couples. In January 2008, LGBT rights activists met with the Deputy Prime Minister, Dušan Čaplovič, to discuss this proposal. Throughout 2008, Iniciatíva Inakosť also held a number of public discussions about registered partnerships. The Green Party supports registered partnerships for same-sex and opposite-sex couples.

In March 2012, the liberal Freedom and Solidarity (SaS) party announced that it would submit a draft law on registered partnerships. On August 23, the registered partnership bill was submitted to Parliament, which would have given same-sex couples similar rights and obligations as married couples, including alimony, inheritance, access to medical documentation and the right to a widow's/widower's pension, but excluding adoption rights. On September 19, the ruling party, Direction - Social Democracy (Smer) announced that it would vote against the bill, which was later rejected by 14–94.

In August 2017, Deputy Speaker of the National Council Lucia Ďuriš Nicholsonová of SaS promised to re-submit draft legislation on registered partnerships to Parliament. On 11 December 2017, following a meeting with Iniciatíva Inakosť representatives, President Andrej Kiska called for a public debate about the rights of same-sex couples. On the same day, SaS reiterated its intention to introduce the registered partnership bill.

SaS introduced its registered partnership bill to the National Council in July 2018. Under the proposed bill, partnerships would have been open to both same-sex and opposite-sex couples and would have granted couples several rights and benefits enjoyed by married couples, namely in the area of inheritance and healthcare, among others. The bill was defeated in September 2018, with only 31 out of 150 lawmakers in support.

In 2019, registered partnerships were opposed by most Slovak political parties, including For the People, Christian Democratic Movement, Christian Union, ĽSNS, OĽaNO, SMER-SD, SNS, VLASŤ and We Are Family. Progressive Slovakia, SaS, Hlas (Since 2022) and SPOLU were in favour. 

In 2021, the Progressive Slovakia party introduced the life partnership bill, but it was rejected in a 7–67 vote. In 2022, the party reintroduced the life partnership bill, but it was defeated in a 31-53 vote.

Same-sex marriage
In January 2014, the Christian Democratic Movement (KDH) announced that it would submit a draft law to prohibit same-sex marriage in the Slovak Constitution. In February 2014, Minister of Culture Marek Maďarič said there were enough SMER-SD MPs in favour of the constitutional ban for it to pass. 40 opposition MPs introduced a draft law to the National Council to ban same-sex marriage in the Slovak Constitution. Slovakia's Social Democratic Prime Minister Robert Fico said that the governing SMER-SD would be willing to support the amendment in exchange for the opposition's support for an amendment introducing changes in the judicial system. The bill passed its first reading in a 103–5 vote in March 2014. The amendment could cause any future laws recognising same-sex couples to be unconstitutional. In June 2014, it was passed and signed into law by President Ivan Gašparovič, with 102 MPs voting for and 18 against. Article 41 reads as follows:

2015 referendum

In December 2013, a conservative civil initiative group Aliancia za rodinu (Alliance for the Family) announced that it would demand a constitutional definition of marriage as "a union solely between a woman and a man". The Alliance intended to initiate referendums on several issues, and demanded a ban on same-sex adoption and the prohibition of sex education in schools. They also suggested that other types of cohabitation should not be held equal to marriage between a man and a woman. Activists from the Alliance also criticised Swedish company Ikea for its corporate magazine, which featured two lesbians raising a son.

In August 2014, Aliancia za rodinu collected more than 400,000 signatures for a petition to hold a referendum on 4 questions:

1. Do you agree that no other cohabitation of persons other than a bond between one man and one woman can be called marriage?

2. Do you agree that same-sex couples or groups shouldn't be allowed to adopt children and subsequently raise them?

3. Do you agree that no other cohabitation of persons other than marriage should be granted particular protection, rights and duties that the legislative norms as of 1 March 2014 only grant to marriage and to spouses (mainly acknowledgement, registration, or recording as a life community in front of a public authority, the possibility to adopt a child by the spouse of a parent)?

4. Do you agree that schools cannot require children to participate in education pertaining to sexual behaviour or euthanasia if their parents or the children themselves do not agree with the content of the education?

President Andrej Kiska asked the Constitutional Court to consider the proposed questions. In October 2014, the Constitutional Court ruled that the third question was unconstitutional.

A referendum on the other three questions was held on 7 February 2015. All three proposals were approved, but the referendum was declared invalid due to insufficient turnout (21.07%). The referendum required a 50% turnout to be valid. Opponents, including human rights activists, advised voters to boycott the referendum.

2018 European Court of Justice ruling

On 5 June 2018, the European Court of Justice ruled in favour of a Romanian-American same-sex couple who sought to have their marriage recognised in Romania so that the American partner could reside in the country. The Court ruled that EU member states may choose whether or not to allow same-sex marriage, but they cannot obstruct the freedom of residence of an EU citizen and their spouse. Furthermore, the Court ruled that the term "spouse" is gender-neutral, and that it does not necessarily imply a person of the opposite sex. Same-sex couples resident in Slovakia who have married in member states that have legalised same-sex marriage, and where one partner is an EU citizen, enjoy full residency rights as a result of the ruling. The Slovak Interior Ministry quickly announced immediate compliance with the ruling.

While the ruling was well received by the International Lesbian, Gay, Bisexual, Trans and Intersex Association (ILGA) and other human rights groups, it was condemned by the Slovak Catholic Church.

Recognition of foreign marriages 
A 2022 ruling by the Žilina Regional Court found that the immigration authority's refusal to recognize the marriage of a Slovak national to his Argentine partner in Argentina for the purposes of granting permanent residency was unconstitutional, on the grounds of unjustified discrimination based on sexual orientation and a violation of the right to private and family life, as well as freedom of residence by preventing a Slovak citizen from returning to his homeland.

Public opinion
Public opinion has shifted in Slovakia in the past few years, becoming more favourable to granting rights to same-sex couples. According to a poll conducted in 2009, 45% of respondents supported same-sex registered partnerships, 41% were opposed, and 14% were unsure. Support for specific rights was higher, with 56% supporting the right of same-sex couples to jointly own property, 72% to access medical information about their partner and 71% supporting the right to bereavement leave.

Support for same-sex marriage remains low compared to other European Union member states. The 2015 Eurobarometer found that 24% of Slovaks supported same-sex marriage, the fourth lowest among EU member states alongside Lithuania. EU-wide support was 61%.

According to a 2017 Pew Research Center poll, 47% of Slovaks supported same-sex marriage, with 47% opposed and 6% undecided. Among 18-34-year-olds, opposition to same-sex marriage was 42%.

The May 2019 Eurobarometer showed that 20% of Slovaks thought same-sex marriage should be allowed throughout Europe, 70% were opposed. This was second lowest level of support in the EU after Bulgaria, and significantly lower than the average of 69%.

A 2019 survey conducted by the AKO polling agency found that 57% of Slovaks were in favour of same-sex registered partnerships.

See also
LGBT rights in Slovakia
Recognition of same-sex unions in Europe

Notes

References

Slovakia
LGBT rights in Slovakia